The 2008-09 Irish Ice Hockey League season was the second season of the Irish Ice Hockey League, the top level of ice hockey in Ireland. Six teams participated in the league, and the Dundalk Bulls won the championship.

Regular season

Playoffs
The league was cancelled mid-season, and the Dundalk Bulls were named champions.

External links
Season on SFRP's Hockey Archive

Irish Ice Hockey League seasons
Irish
ice hockey
ice hockey